The large-eye snaggletooth (Borostomias antarcticus), also called the straightline dragonfish or Antarctic snaggletooth, is a species of fish in the family Stomiidae (barbeled dragonfishes).

Description

It has 9–13 dorsal soft rays and 12–17 anal soft rays. It is identified by the lack of high arch in the photophores behind the anal base, presence of double postorbital organ and the clear separation of the dagger-like teeth in its upper jaw. It has 40–60 lateral photophores extending along its belly and positioned in two straight lines.

Habitat
It is found in oceans worldwide.

Behaviour
The large-eye snaggletooth feeds on mysids, bony fish and crustaceans.

References

Stomiidae
Fish described in 1905
Taxa named by Einar Lönnberg